Arthur Brooke (1845–1918)  founder of the British tea company Brooke, Bond & Co. Ltd born in Manchester, Great Britain. Established his business in 1869 and was making £5,000 a year at the age of 30 with shops in all the major cities of Britain and warehouse in London.

Early life 
Arthur Brooke was born on 30 November 1845 in Ashton-under-Lyne, Manchester to tea wholesaler Charles Brooke and Jane née Howard. He had a short career in the textile industry before getting terminated due to the cotton famine in 1864, he trained to work in Peek Brothers and Winch tea company in Liverpool where he was transferred to the company's head office in London. But Brooke decided to return home to help in father to revive his wholesale tea business by establishing new outlets all over Lancashire.

Personal life 
Brooke was married to Alice Young daughter of William Young a naval officer, in 1875. They first lived in Stonebridge Park, Willesden then moved to Bedford park, then Kensington later bought a country house near Dorking. The couple had four children Gerald, Justin, Neville, and Rupert and two known grandchildren namely John and David, who were all involved in the company. Brooke also had a younger sister named Agnes Bushell (née Brooke), who went on to marry Alfred Thomas Bushell who previously worked in Brooke's Liverpool shop. Bushell emigrated to Australia and founded the Bushells Tea Company. Brooke died on 13 April 1918 in Dorking due to acute tuberculosis and pneumonia. A Blue Plaque was donated in his honour Brooke, Bond & Co in 1966 which can be seen at his birthplace in 6 George street, Ashton-under-Lyne.

Arthur Brooke in Brooke, Bond & Company Ltd. 
In 1869 Brooke opened his first own shop and named the business Brooke Bond & Company at 29 Market Street, Manchester where he sold tea, coffee and sugar. He added the name Bond even though there was no Mr Bond because he liked the sound of it, hence the name stayed.

Brooke developed and blended his products and sold them in ½ lb and 1 lb paper bags. He offered precise mixtures of premium blends of tea and did not go with the marketing trends of the day, so customers could buy consistent flavours from week to week. Each bag was signed with the company name to avoid counterfeiting. Brooke delivered his products in his own transport to make sure they reached his customers regularly and always fresh, promising good quality products as the company's goal. One of Brooke's early slogan was "Good Tea unites good company, exhilarates the spirits, opens the heart, banishes restraint from conversation and promotes the happiest purposes of social intercourse" which indicated his adeptness for good advertising.

In the early 1870s Brooke opened a warehouse in a London and shops in Liverpool, Leeds, London, Bradford and few stores in Scotland. The company headquarters in 1872 at 129 Whitechapel High Street in London. When the British trade industries were hit by long depression Brooke Bond had to close their stores in London and Scotland. Arthur Brooke had considered moving to New Zealand before he decided to sell his products to wholesale grocers that changed the direction of his business. This helped in further expanding the business but Brooke Bond was now selling tea in packets to wholesale grocers instead of hand delivering 1/2 lb and 1 lb paper bags to customers.

In 1892 the company became Brooke Bond & Company Ltd and the business was largely wholesale and Arthur Brooke became the chairperson and continued that role until he retired in 1910.The company expanded leading to purchases of warehouse on Whitehorse Street, Leeds and a sixty-eight-year signed lease of St. Dunstan's Hill, London which was the registered office of the company. The company was known to have become freeholders of warehouses in Goulston Street London in 1898.

The business under Arthur Brooke was expanded to the Indian market as Brooke Bond Red label in 1903, where the brand is popular to this day.

Brooke strictly followed the eight considered a model employers his employees looked upon him more as a colleague than an employer.

His son Gerald Brooke took over the business as chairperson after Arthur Brooke retired in 1910.

References 

1845 births
1918 deaths
People from Ashton-under-Lyne
British company founders
British industrialists
Tea brands
Unilever brands
19th-century British businesspeople